Kapteyn series is a series expansion of analytic functions on a domain in terms of the Bessel function of the first kind. Kapteyn series are named after Willem Kapteyn, who first studied such series in 1893. Let  be a function analytic on the domain

Then  can be expanded in the form

where

Kapteyn's series are important in physical problems. Among other applications, the solution  of Kepler's equation  can be expressed via a Kapteyn series:

Relation between the Taylor coefficients and the  coefficients of a function

Let us suppose that the Taylor series of  reads as

Then the  coefficients in the Kapteyn expansion of  can be determined as follows.

Examples

For  it follows (see also )

and for  

Furthermore, inside the region ,

See also 
Schlömilch's series

References

Series expansions